Hand Therapy is a quarterly peer-reviewed academic journal covering the field of physical medicine and rehabilitation, especially physiotherapy and occupational therapy for the hand. The editor-in-chief is Christina Jerosch-Herold (University of East Anglia). It was established in 1991 and is published by SAGE Publications in association with the British Association of Hand Therapists and the European Federation of Societies for Hand Therapy.

Abstracting and indexing
The journal is abstracted and indexed in Scopus.

References

External links

SAGE Publishing academic journals
English-language journals
Rehabilitation medicine journals
Publications established in 1991
Quarterly journals